Canaday is a surname and phonetically equivalent to Kennedy. Notable people with the surname include:

John Canaday (1907–1985), American art historian
Kameron Canaday (born 1993), American football player
Sage Canaday (born 1985), American long-distance runner
 (1903–1971), American painter